Elbirt Almeron Woodward (March 24, 1836 – September 29, 1905) was a major figure in the Boss Tweed corruption scandal in 1871. He served as the assistant clerk to the New York City Board of Supervisors. He was a member of the Connecticut Senate representing the 12th District from 1870 to 1871. At the Democratic State Convention a year after his term as senator, he received 89 votes for the party's nomination for Lieutenant Governor of Connecticut. Although he was most commonly referred to as "Elbert A. Woodward," his true given name was spelled "Elbirt" as proven by examples of his actual handwritten signature.

Early life and family 
He was born in Buffalo, New York, the son of Reverend Charles Moore Woodward and Zilpah Hutchinson. He married Harriet Hannah Ford (1835–1887) on August 24, 1857 in New York City. They had seven children: Charles Eugene Woodward (1858–1858), Harriet Louise Woodward (1860–1860), Franklin Warren Woodward (1862–1922), Charles Elbirt Woodward (1866–1903), James Ingersoll Woodward (1869–1875), Harriet ("Hattie") Louise Woodward (1872–1975), and John Bell Woodward (1875–1955). They divorced in October 1880. Elbirt A. Woodward married Mary Currier Hanford (1856–1947)--the daughter of a business partner—on April 21, 1881 in South Norwalk. They had one daughter, Charlotte ("Lottie") Hanford Woodward (1882–1967), who married Walter S. Munro (1873 –1910) in 1907 in South Norwalk.

Tammany Hall corruption 
In his capacity as assistant clerk, he would inflate the amount of bills to the city, and distribute the money to the bank accounts of his accomplices. He became wealthy by processing, depositing and sharing in many of the fraudulent payments. He assisted in defrauding the city of between $25 and $45 million. He was indicted and tried, but fled the United States to Spain. He was arrested in Chicago, and brought back to New York. In the end, he avoided jail time, and was forced to repay $151,779 to the city.

On December 18, 1871, a grand jury indicted Tweed and Woodward on two counts of forgery in the third degree and one count of grand larceny. No trial followed any of these indictments. On February 3, 1872, a new series of indictments based on the same charges and evidence were issued. These included two counts of forgery in the third degree against Tweed and Woodward, one count of grand larceny, and one of larceny

In his later years, he was a farmer in Norwalk.

Associations 
 Founding incorporator (1871), Old Well Club

Further reading 
 Report of the Special Committee of the Board of Aldermen Appointed to Investigate the "Ring" Frauds
 Boss Tweed in Court
 News of the Day
New York V. Tweed
 Doomed by Cartoon
The memorial history of the City of New-York (v. 3)
 Woodward In Chicago
 Independent Hour
 Where is Woodward?
 Boss Tweed’s Ring and the Continuing Quest for Integrity in Government
 Again On The Stand
 A Pal Of Tweed Caught

References

1836 births
1905 deaths
19th-century American politicians
American fraudsters
Burials in Riverside Cemetery (Norwalk, Connecticut)
Democratic Party Connecticut state senators
Farmers from Connecticut
Fugitives
Leaders of Tammany Hall
Politicians from Buffalo, New York
Politicians from Norwalk, Connecticut